Catherine Heymans  (born 1978/1979) is a British astrophysicist, the Astronomer Royal for Scotland, and a professor at the University of Edinburgh based at the Royal Observatory, Edinburgh.

Early life
Heymans was born and grew up in Hitchin, Hertfordshire, and educated at Hitchin Girls' School.

She received a first class Master of Physics (MPhys) degree from the University of Edinburgh in 2000. In 2003, she received her doctorate from the University of Oxford for research, supervised by Lance Miller, and in collaboration with Alan Heavens, on gravitational lensing.

Career and research
She won a series of fellowships at the Max Planck Institute for Astronomy, the University of British Columbia,  the Institut d'astrophysique de Paris and the University of Edinburgh. In 2009 she was awarded a starting grant from the European Research Council (ERC) and was subsequently appointed a lecturer at the University of Edinburgh.

Heymans is best known for her work on using the technique of cosmic weak gravitational lensing to learn more about the Universe. She led the Shear Testing Programme STEP1 competition and co-leads the lensing collaboration of the Canada–France–Hawaii Telescope Legacy Survey: CFHTLenS.

Heymans is one of the leaders of the European Southern Observatory (ESO) project Kilo-Degree Survey (KiDS). 
In 2018 she was presented with the Max Planck-Humboldt Research Award, which is worth €1.5 million and financed by funds from the German Federal Ministry of Education and Research (BMBF). The award is presented jointly by the Max Planck Society and the Alexander von Humboldt Foundation. The award will be used to establish the German Centre for Cosmological Lensing at the 
Ruhr University Bochum.

Heymans teaches on the Massive open online course (MOOC) at Coursera on AstroTech: The Science and Technology behind Astronomical Discovery. Her research has been funded by the Science and Technology Facilities Council (STFC).

Awards and honours
Heymans was awarded the George Darwin Lectureship by the Royal Astronomical Society in 2017. In 2018 she was elected a Fellow of the Royal Society of Edinburgh (FRSE).

In May 2021, she was the first woman appointed as the Astronomer Royal for Scotland, and the 11th person to hold the post.

References

Academics of the University of Edinburgh
Alumni of the University of Edinburgh
Alumni of the University of Oxford
British astrophysicists
British women physicists
Living people
Women astronomers
Academic staff of the University of British Columbia
Year of birth missing (living people)
Fellows of the Royal Society of Edinburgh
People from Hitchin
1970s births